The 467th Strategic Fighter Squadron is an inactive United States Air Force unit. Its last assignment was with the 508th Strategic Fighter Wing at Turner Air Force Base, Georgia, where it was inactivated on 11 May 1956.

History

World War II

Formed in late 1944 under Second Air Force as one of the last Republic P-47 Thunderbolt fighter squadrons, programmed for deployment to Western Pacific theater with long-range P-47Ns for Boeing B-29 Superfortress escort missions.    Arrived in Hawaii in early 1945, assigned to Seventh Air Force.    Lack of a serious fighter defense over Japan at high altitudes and reprogramming of B-29 raids over Japan to night low-level fast attacks led to reassignment as a replacement training unit based in Hawaii; also performed air defense of the islands until inactivation in November 1945.

Strategic Air Command
Reactivated as Strategic Air Command fighter-escort squadron for Boeing B-50 Superfortress and Convair B-36 Peacemaker bombers.  Performed fighter-escort training throughout the 1950s, inactivated in 1956 with the phaseout of the escort mission and retirement of the B-36.

Lineage
 Constituted as the 467th Fighter Squadron on 5 October 1944
 Activated on 12 October 1944.
 Inactivated on 25 November 1945
 Redesignated 467th Fighter-Escort Squadron on 19 June 1952
 Activated on 1 July 1952
 Redesignated 467th Strategic Fighter Squadron on 20 January 1953
 Inactivated on 11 May 1956

Assignments
 508th Fighter Group, 12 October 1944 – 25 November 1945
 508th Fighter-Escort Wing (later 508th Strategic Fighter Wing), 1 July 1952 – 11 May 1956

Stations

 Peterson Field, Colorado, 12 October 1944
 Pocatello Army Air Field, Idaho, 25 October 1944
 Bruning Army Air Field, Nebraska, 15 November – 18 December 1944
 Kahuku Army Air Field, Hawaii, 6 January 1945

 Mokuleia Airfield, Hawaii, 3 March 1945
 Bellows Field, Hawaii, 16 September – 25 November 1945
 Turner Air Force Base, Georgia, 1 July 1952 – 11 May 1956

Aircraft
 Republic P-47 Thunderbolt, 1944–1945
 Republic F-84 Thunderjet, 1952–1956

References

Notes
 Explanatory notes

 Citations

Bibliography

 
 
 

Fighter squadrons of the United States Air Force
Units and formations of Strategic Air Command